Trissexodontidae is a family of air-breathing land snails, terrestrial pulmonate gastropod mollusks in the superfamily Helicoidea (according to the taxonomy of the Gastropoda by Bouchet & Rocroi, 2005).

This family has no subfamilies. The family Trissexodontidae was separated out from the families Hygromiidae and Helicodontidae, and some authors still classify these species within those families.

Distribution 
The distribution of Trissexodontidae includes the Iberian peninsula, northwest Africa, Azores, Canary Islands, Madeira and Cape Verde.

Genera
Genera within the family Trissexodontidae include:

 Caracollina Beck, 1837
 Gasullia Ortiz de Zárate López, 1962
 Gasulliella Gittenberger, 1980 - with only one species, Gasulliella simplicula (Morelet, 1845)
 Gittenbergeria Schileyko, 1991
 Mastigophallus Hesse, 1918 - with only one species, Mastigophallus rangianus (Michaud, 1831)
 Oestophora Hesse, 1907
 Oestophorella Pfeffere, 1929
 Trissexodon Pilsbry, 1895 - type genus of the family Trissexodontidae
 Spirorbula Lowe, 1852 - probable classification, from Madeira and Porto Sancto
 Suboestophora Ortiz de Zárate López, 1962

Description 
Shells of species in the family Trissexodontidae are flat and regularly ribbed. The periostracum of the shell surface has no hairs.

A description of the reproductive system was summarized by Prieto et al. (1993).

In this family, the number of haploid chromosomes is known only for the genus Oestophora (n=30).

References

External links 

 Nordsieck H.  "Higher classification of Helicoidea (Gastropoda: Stylommatophora) and the molecular analyses of their phylogeny".